Thomas Julien Daniel Chesneau (born 28 April 1999) is a French professional footballer who plays as a goalkeeper.

References

External links
 
 

1999 births
Living people
Footballers from Hauts-de-Seine
French footballers
Association football goalkeepers
Liga I players
Liga II players
CS Concordia Chiajna players
FC Dinamo București players
Expatriate footballers in Romania
French expatriate footballers
Paris Saint-Germain F.C. players
People from Sèvres